William Joseph Haynes Jr. (born 1949) is a former United States district judge of the United States District Court for the Middle District of Tennessee.

Early life and education 

Born in Memphis, Tennessee, Haynes received a Bachelor of Arts degree from College of St. Thomas in 1970 and a Juris Doctor from Vanderbilt University School of Law in 1973.

Professional career 

Haynes worked in the Tennessee Attorney General's Office from 1973 to 1984, as an assistant state attorney general from 1973 to 1977, then as a senior state assistant general from 1977 to 1978, and finally as a deputy state attorney general from 1978 to 1984. He was in private practice in Nashville, Tennessee in 1984. He was an adjunct professor, Southeastern Paralegal Institute from 1986 to 1990. He was an adjunct professor, Vanderbilt University School of Law from 1987 to 1994 and from 1997 to 1998.

Federal judicial service 

From 1984 until 1999, Haynes served as a United States magistrate judge for the United States District Court for the Middle District of Tennessee. On May 27, 1999, President Bill Clinton nominated Haynes to be a United States District Judge of the United States District Court for the Middle District of Tennessee, to a seat vacated by Thomas A. Higgins. He was confirmed by the United States Senate on November 10, 1999, and received his commission on November 15, 1999. He served as Chief Judge from 2012 to 2014. He assumed  senior status on December 1, 2014. He retired from active service on January 16, 2017.

See also 
 List of African-American federal judges
 List of African-American jurists
 List of first minority male lawyers and judges in Tennessee

Sources

1949 births
Living people
African-American judges
Judges of the United States District Court for the Middle District of Tennessee
People from Memphis, Tennessee
United States district court judges appointed by Bill Clinton
United States magistrate judges
Vanderbilt University Law School alumni
Vanderbilt University faculty
20th-century American judges
21st-century American judges